Jean-Fernand Leischen (21 August 1919 – 20 April 2017) was a Luxembourgian fencer who competed in three Summer Olympic Games, competing in the men's individual and team épée events at each one. His best was result was fourth at the team épée event at the 1952 Summer Olympics in Helsinki, Finland. In 2008 he was promoted to the rank of Chevalier in the Order of Merit of the Grand Duchy of Luxembourg. He also served as President of the Luxembourg Fencing Federation from 1961-1964.

References

1919 births
2017 deaths
People from Differdange
Luxembourgian male épée fencers
Olympic fencers of Luxembourg
Fencers at the 1948 Summer Olympics
Fencers at the 1952 Summer Olympics
Fencers at the 1956 Summer Olympics
Knights of the Order of Merit of the Grand Duchy of Luxembourg